Parlett is an unincorporated community in Wayne Township, Jefferson County, Ohio, United States.

History
In 1909, a coal mine called the Wabash Mine was owned by the Wabash Coal Company of Cleveland, with 76 employees. By 1915, the mine had been renamed the Netta Mine and had transferred ownership to the Netta Coal Company, also of Cleveland, with 84 employees working.  The Wabash Railroad maintained a station in Parlett for loading the coal.  In 1921, there was a 300-ton steam shovel operating at the mine that had "been there for a considerable time", owned by the Wayne Coal Company. 

The Parlett Post Office was established on March 26, 1906 and discontinued on January 14, 1928. Mail service is now handled through the Cadiz branch.

References

Unincorporated communities in Jefferson County, Ohio